In data communications networks, packet segmentation is the process of dividing a data packet into smaller units for transmission over the network. Packet segmentation happens at layer four of the OSI model; the transport layer. Segmentation may be required when:
 The data packet is larger than the maximum transmission unit supported by the network
 The network is unreliable and it is desirable to divide the information into smaller segments to maximize the probability that each one of them can be delivered correctly to the destination

Protocols that perform packet segmentation at the source usually include a mechanism at the destination to reverse the process and reassemble the original packet from individual segments. This process may include automatic repeat-request (ARQ) mechanisms to detect missing segments and to request the source to re-transmit specific segments.

In a communication system based on a layered OSI model, packet segmentation may be responsible for splitting one MPDU into multiple physical layer service data units so that reliable transmission (and potential re-transmission via ARQ) of each one can be performed individually.

The ITU-T G.hn standard, which provides a way to create a high-speed (up to 1 gigabit/s) local area network using existing home wiring (power lines, phone lines and coaxial cables), is an example of a protocol that employs packet segmentation to increase reliability over noisy media.

See also
 Fujitsu Ltd. v. Netgear Inc.
 Packet aggregation
 Segmentation and reassembly

References

Packets (information technology)